"Saker man ser" (Swedish for Things One Sees) is a song by Swedish alternative rock band Kent. It was released in January 1998 as the second single from the album Isola. A version in English was also released under the title "Things She Said".

Track listing

CD Single (Maxi)
 Saker man ser (3:54)
 December (3:46)
 Längesen vi sågs (4:29)

CD in cardboard sleeve
 Saker man ser
 Glider

Charts

References

1998 singles
Kent (band) songs
1998 songs
RCA Victor singles
Songs written by Joakim Berg